Kelch repeat and BTB domain-containing protein 10 is a protein that in humans is encoded by the KBTBD10 gene.

References

Further reading

External links
 
 

Kelch proteins